Rockwell Medical Inc., based in Wixom, Michigan, focuses on development and commercialization of treatments against diseases such as end-stage renal disease (ESRD) and chronic kidney disease (CKD).

The company's primary customers are dialysis providers such as DaVita Inc. (46% of 2018 revenues).

The company was founded in 1996.

Products

Triferic
Triferic was approved by the Food and Drug Administration (FDA) in January 2015. Triferic is the only FDA-approved therapy indicated to replace iron and maintain hemoglobin in adult hemodialysis patients with chronic kidney disease. Triferic replaces the iron lost during hemodialysis treatments. Triferic delivers iron directly to transferrin which transported it to the bone marrow to make hemoglobin. Rockwell is actively marketing and commercializing Triferic in the U.S. hemodialysis market. In February 2014, the Company completed its long-term safety study for Triferic.

Calcitriol
Calcitriol (active vitamin D) generic is FDA approved for treating secondary hyperparathyroidism or hypocalcemia in hemodialysis patients.

Hemodialysis Concentrates
Rockwell is a manufacturer of hemodialysis concentrates/dialysates for dialysis providers and distributors in the U.S. and globally. Hemodialysis concentrates remove toxins and replace critical nutrients in the dialysis patient’s bloodstream during hemodialysis. Rockwell has three U.S. manufacturing and distribution facilities.

Iron (III) pyrophosphate
One of the main treatments that the company develops is iron (III) pyrophosphate, for iron supplementation, a key element in the formation of new red blood cells. It was licensed in 2011 for the delivery of iron supplementation for patients who suffer from anemic dialysis since the process accounts for treatment in around 90% of anemia patients.

References

External links
 

1996 establishments in Michigan
American companies established in 1996
Companies listed on the Nasdaq
Health care companies based in Michigan
Health care companies established in 1996